Plavnik is an unpopulated island in the Adriatic Sea, belonging to Croatia located between the Central Straits and the Kvarner Bay. The Krusija Channel cuts it off from the eastern coast of the island of Cres. This channel is the shortest route from the Adriatic Sea through the islands to Rijeka. A lighthouse, established in 1890, sits  at the northwestern point of the islet, marking the east side of the narrowest opening of the Krusija Channel.

Geography

On the northern and north-eastern sides, the coastline is partially steep. Two islets that make up the Kormati island (Otok Kormati), lie to the southeast of Plavnik.

Flora and fauna
Plavnik is home to birds such as the wheateaters, pheasant, and white-headed vulture. Hares are common as well. , the islet is in the process of being declared a zoological and botanical reserve.

References

External links

Plavnik at CroatiaTouristCenter.com

Uninhabited islands of Croatia
Islands of the Adriatic Sea
Landforms of Primorje-Gorski Kotar County